4.1 Miles is a 2016 short documentary film about a Hellenic Coast Guard captain on the Greek island of Lesbos charged with the task of saving thousands of migrants crossing the Aegean Sea during the European migrant crisis. The film was directed by Daphne Matziaraki.

Release
The film premiered on NYTimes.com in September 2016 as part of Op-Docs, the newspaper's editorial department's forum for short, opinionated documentaries.

Awards
 2016: 43rd Annual Student Film Awards - Best Documentary (Gold)
 2016: Peabody Award
 2017: 89th Academy Awards  Best Documentary Short Subject (nominated)

References

External links
 
 The complete documentary on the New York Times website

2016 films
2016 short documentary films
Greek short documentary films
2010s Greek-language films
Peabody Award-winning broadcasts
Films shot in Lesbos
Works about the European migrant crisis
Works originally published in The New York Times